On 15 March 2022, an improvised explosive device detonated on a convoy of security forces in the village of Sangan, Sibi District in Balochistan, Pakistan killing four Frontier Corps personnel and seriously injuring six others.

References

2022 murders in Pakistan
March 2022 crimes in Asia
March 2022 events in Pakistan
Mass murder in 2022
Mass murder in Balochistan, Pakistan
Pakistani police officers killed in the line of duty
Terrorist incidents in Pakistan in 2022
Improvised explosive device bombings in 2022
Sibi District